Nelson R. Strong (11 February 1862 – 26 February 1930) was an American politician.

Strong was born on 11 February 1862, and served as a founding developer and the first mayor of Port Arthur, Texas, between 1898 and 1899. He married Cora Gray Strong in 1905, and the couple settled in her hometown of Slocum, Texas. Nelson Strong was elected to Texas House of Representatives in 1928, and held the District 55 seat as a Democrat from 8 January 1929 until his death on 26 February 1930. Strong's wife succeeded him as a state representative.

References

People from Port Arthur, Texas
People from Anderson County, Texas
20th-century American politicians
19th-century American politicians
American city founders
Mayors of places in Texas
Democratic Party members of the Texas House of Representatives
1862 births
1930 deaths
Spouses of Texas politicians